The 2012 Missouri State Bears football team represented Missouri State University in the 2012 NCAA Division I FCS football season. They were led by seventh-year head coach Terry Allen and played their home games at the Plaster Sports Complex. They are a member of the Missouri Valley Football Conference. They finished the season 3–8, 3–5 in MVFC play to finish in eighth place.

Schedule

References

Missouri State
Missouri State Bears football seasons
Missouri State Bears football